Lecithocera autologa is a moth in the family Lecithoceridae. It was described by Edward Meyrick in 1910. It is found in Sri Lanka.

The wingspan is about 14 mm. The forewings are fuscous, irrorated (sprinkled) with dark fuscous. The discal stigmata are dark fuscous. The hindwings are grey.

References

Moths described in 1910
autologa